OneLink may refer to:

AppsFlyer produce a product called OneLink
OneLink Communications, former brand of computer/cable company Liberty Puerto Rico
OneLink Transit Systems, or Metcard, an integrated ticketing system for public transport in Melbourne